Copper Cove is a small cove 2 nautical miles (3.7 km) north of Helm Point, indenting the east side of Honeycomb Ridge at the west margin of Moubray Bay. So named by the New Zealand Geological Survey Antarctic Expedition (NZGSAE), 1957-58, because its cliffs are in places stained green by the weathering products of copper ores.

Geography of Antarctica